Lokmanya Nagar is a locality in Thane city of Maharashtra state in India. It nearly 6 kilometers from Thane railway station and is sheltered by Sanjay Gandhi National Park. It is also near to Upvan Lake,

Brihanmumbai Electricity Supply & Transport (BEST) 

List of some important BEST bus route numbers plying to and from and passing through Mulund:

Thane Municipal Transport (TMT)

TMT
There are a number of Thane Municipal Transport buses for traveling to and from Thane district. The two major TMT bus stops are at the Kelkar - Vaze College (Mulund East) and Mulund Railway Station (West).

Other
Autorickshaws and taxis are also very common in Lokmanya Nagar.

See also
 Patlipada
 Hiranandani Estate
 Kolshet
 Kaasar Vadavali
 Waghbil
 Brahmand
 Brindaban Society
 Wagle Estate
 Talao Pali
 Thanecha Ashtavinayak
 Panchpakhadi
 Ghodbunder Fort
 Upvan Lake

References

External links
 Thaneweb.com - The city portal

Neighbourhoods in Thane
Memorials to Bal Gangadhar Tilak
Geography of Thane